Hugo Sellheim (December 28, 1871, Biblis bei Worms – April 22, 1936, Leipzig) was a pioneering physician in the field of gynecology and obstetrics. He is credited with performing the first thoracic paravertebral block, in 1905.

He was Professor and Chairman of OB/Gyn at the University of Leipzig from 1926 until his death in 1936. He served as the 21st president of the German Society of Gynecology and Obstetrics.  He was an early investigator into chemical pregnancy tests, the establishment of paternity, the mechanism of rotation of the fetal head during birth, and he made contributions to education regarding sexuality and contraception.

References 

Thoracic Paravertebral Block, British Journal of Anaesthesia 1998; 81 : 230-238

1871 births
1936 deaths
German gynaecologists
Academic staff of Leipzig University
People from Bergstraße (district)